Leather is a material created through the tanning of hides and skins of animals. 

Leather or Leathers may also refer to:

People
 Leather (surname)
 Leather (comics), a character from DC Comics
 Leather Tuscadero, a character from the television sitcom Happy Days
 Catherine Anne Leone, metal vocalist known professionally as Leather Leone

Music
 Leather (album), an album by Enrique Iglesias
 "Leathers" (Deftones song), a song by Deftones from Koi No Yokan
 Läther (pronounced "leather"), a Frank Zappa album
 "Leather", a song by Tori Amos from Little Earthquakes

Sports
Various types of balls made of leather:
Cricket ball 
Ball (gridiron football)
Baseball (ball)

Other uses
 Leather subculture
 Motorcycle leathers, protective one- or two-piece suits worn by motorcyclists, mainly for protection in a crash

See also

 Lather (disambiguation)
 Leithers, people from Leith